James Newton Howard (born June 9, 1951) is an American film composer, music producer and keyboardist. He has scored over 100 films and is the recipient of a Grammy Award, an Emmy Award, and nine nominations for Academy Awards. His film scores include Pretty Woman (1990), The Fugitive (1993), Space Jam (1996), Peter Pan (2003), King Kong (2005), The Dark Knight (2008) which he composed with Hans Zimmer, and Fantastic Beasts and Where to Find Them (2016). He has collaborated extensively with directors M. Night Shyamalan and Francis Lawrence, having scored eight of Shyamalan's films since The Sixth Sense (1999) and all of Lawrence's films since I Am Legend (2007).

Early life and career 
Howard was born in Los Angeles. He is from a musical family; his grandmother was a violinist. His father was Jewish but he did not want his children to know he was, so he changed his last name from Horowitz to Howard.

Howard began studying music as a child, taking classical piano lessons at the age of four. He went on to attend the Thacher School in Ojai, California and the Music Academy of the West in Santa Barbara, California with Reginald Stewart and Leon Fleischer. He then attended the University of Southern California, studying at the School of Music as a piano performance major, but dropped out after 6 weeks because "He wanted to do other things than practicing the piano."

After Howard left college, he joined a short-lived rock band called Mama Lion.  The band was led by Neil Merryweather (bass, backing vocals) and featured lead singer Lynn Carey, Coffi Hall on drums, and Rick Gaxiola on guitar.  Mama Lion recorded two full-length albums.  Members of Mama Lion also formed the band Heavy Cruiser with Merryweather now on lead vocals, recording two albums whose genre was closer to hard rock but also displayed psychedelic and progressive influences. He then worked for a couple of years as a session musician with artists including Diana Ross, Ringo Starr, and Harry Nilsson. In the early 70s, he described himself as being "dirt poor", until his big break in 1975 when his manager got him an audition with Elton John. He joined John's band and toured with them as keyboardist during the late 70s and early 80s. He was part of the band that played Central Park, New York, on September 13, 1980. Howard also arranged strings for several of John's songs during this period including the hits "Don't Go Breaking My Heart" and "Sorry Seems to Be the Hardest Word", and played additional keyboards and synthesizers on studio albums including Rock of the Westies (1975), Blue Moves (1976), 21 at 33 (1980), and The Fox (1981).

In 1982, Howard was featured on Toto IV as the strings conductor and orchestrator for "I Won't Hold You Back", "Afraid of Love", and "Lovers in the Night". In 1984  the Sheffield Lab direct-to-disc album James Newton Howard and Friends, was released, which featured Toto's David Paich (keyboards), Steve Porcaro (keyboards), Jeff Porcaro (drums), and Joe Porcaro (percussion).

In 1983, Howard was co-producer, musician (keyboards), and orchestrator of Riccardo Cocciante's album Sincerità.

In 1984, Howard composed his first piece of score for a film, receiving a co-writing credit with David Paich for the cue "Trip to Arrakis" in Toto's music for the David Lynch film Dune.

After briefly touring with Crosby, Stills, and Nash, he took an opportunity brought to him by his manager to write a score for a film. This career move would lead to his becoming a successful film music composer. During this early foray into film music, he did not entirely abandon his previous musical path and returned for a brief collaboration with Elton John on his Tour De Force of Australia in the fall of 1986. He conducted both his own and Paul Buckmaster's arrangements during the second half of the set, which focused on orchestrated performances of selected songs from the Elton John catalog.

1990s–2000s 
Howard scored the surprise blockbuster romantic comedy Pretty Woman (1990) and received his first Academy Award nomination for his score for Barbra Streisand's drama The Prince of Tides (1991). Setting the musical mood for numerous films throughout the decade, Howard's skills encompassed a plethora of genres, including four more best original score Oscar nominations, for the Harrison Ford action feature The Fugitive (1993), the Julia Roberts romantic comedy My Best Friend's Wedding (1997), M. Night Shyamalan's The Village (2004), and Michael Clayton (2007). In addition, Howard scored the Western epic Wyatt Earp (1994), Kevin Costner's Waterworld (1995), and Primal Fear (1996).  His collaborations on songs for One Fine Day (1996) and Junior (1994) garnered Oscar nominations for Best Song. Along with scoring small-scaled, independent films such as Five Corners (1988), Glengarry Glen Ross (1992), and American Heart (1993), Howard proved equally skilled at composing for big-budget Hollywood spectacles, including Space Jam (1996), Dante's Peak (1997) (theme only – score was composed by John Frizzell), and Collateral (2004). He has also scored four Disney animated feature films: Dinosaur (2000), Atlantis: The Lost Empire (2001), Treasure Planet (2002), and Raya and the Last Dragon (2021). Although he concentrates primarily on films, Howard has also contributed music for TV, earning an Emmy nomination in 1995 for his theme to NBC's ratings smash ER (Howard also scored the two-hour pilot); he also provided the themes for The Sentinel and Gideon's Crossing, winning an Emmy for the latter.

He has scored many of Shyamalan's suspense thrillers, The Sixth Sense (1999), Unbreakable (2000), Signs (2002), The Village (2004), Lady in the Water (2006), The Happening (2008), and The Last Airbender (2010), notably dropping the intense, yet subtle, opening credit music for The Sixth Sense from the corresponding soundtrack album.

On October 14, 2005, Howard replaced Howard Shore as composer for King Kong, due to "differing creative aspirations for the score" between Shore and director Peter Jackson. The resultant score earned Howard his first Golden Globe nomination for Best Original Score. His work on Michael Clayton earned him an Oscar nomination. He followed in 2008 with his eighth Oscar nomination for Edward Zwick's Defiance. He also collaborated with Hans Zimmer on the scores for Batman Begins and its record-breaking sequel The Dark Knight.

Further works were The Happening, his sixth film with M. Night Shyamalan, Blood Diamond, Michael Clayton, The Water Horse: Legend of the Deep, I Am Legend, Charlie Wilson's War, and Shyamalan's film adaptation of the Nickelodeon series Avatar: the Last Airbender.

Howard debuted his work for symphony orchestra, I Would Plant A Tree, in February 2009 as part of the Pacific Symphony's annual American Composers Festival. The debut took place at the Renee and Henry Segerstrom Concert Hall in Costa Mesa, California, with the Symphony under the direction of Carl St.Clair.

After being replaced in later seasons, his original theme song for the hit TV show ER returned for the final episode of the series.

2010s 
In September 2010, he was appointed visiting professor of media composition at the Royal Academy of Music in London.

From 2012 to 2015, James Newton Howard scored the music for the critically acclaimed Hunger Games franchise.

From 2014 to 2015, Howard saw major success with The Hunger Games: Mockingjay – Part 1 when he composed the score for the movie, which included "The Hanging Tree", featuring vocals from actress Jennifer Lawrence. The song peaked at number 12 on the Billboard Hot 100, becoming the highest-charting single from The Hunger Games movies and both Howard's and Lawrence's first chart single.

In 2014, Howard scored two Academy Award-nominated films, Nightcrawler and Maleficent.

Howard composed the score for the fantasy drama Fantastic Beasts and Where to Find Them, a spin-off/prequel of the Harry Potter film series, and for its sequels, Fantastic Beasts: The Crimes of Grindelwald and Fantastic Beasts: The Secrets of Dumbledore.

In 2015, James Newton Howard was named the new artistic director of the Henry Mancini Institute (HMI) at the Frost School of Music at the University of Miami in Coral Gables, Florida.

On March 23–24, 2019, Los Angeles Chamber Orchestra gave the world premiere of Howard's Concerto for Cello & Orchestra with LACO principal cello Andrew Shulman as the soloist. The Los Angeles Times described the work as having "an elegiac tone, along with thematic material from the beginning and closing titles of Red Sparrow" the score of which Howard was working on while first composing the concerto.

Personal life 
When delving into his family history, twenty-five years after the death of his father, Howard learned that his father was Jewish  (the family's original surname was Horowitz). Although raised Protestant, Howard later became a practicing Reconstructionist Jew.

James Newton Howard was married to Rosanna Arquette in 1986, they divorced one year later. In 1992, he married Sophie Howard and they have two children: Jackson and Hayden.

Awards 
In May 2008, he was made an Honorary Member of the Royal Academy of Music.

In 2009, he was awarded a Grammy alongside Hans Zimmer for the score soundtrack album to The Dark Knight.

In October 2015, he was honored with the Max Steiner Film Music Achievement Award during the annual Hollywood in Vienna concert.

Discography

Albums

Works as composer

Film

1980s

1990s

2000s

2010s

2020s

Television

Other work

See also 
 List of film director and composer collaborations

References

External links 

 
 
 Full discography James Newton Howard at FilmMusicSite.com

1951 births
20th-century American composers
20th-century American conductors (music)
20th-century American Jews
20th-century American keyboardists
20th-century American male musicians
20th-century American pianists
21st-century American composers
21st-century American conductors (music)
21st-century American Jews
21st-century American keyboardists
21st-century American male musicians
21st-century American pianists
American film score composers
American male conductors (music)
American male film score composers
American male pianists
American rock keyboardists
American rock pianists
American session musicians
American television composers
Animated film score composers
Classical musicians from California
Converts to Judaism from Protestantism
Converts to Reconstructionist Judaism
Elton John Band members
Emmy Award winners
Grammy Award winners
Honorary Members of the Royal Academy of Music
Intrada Records artists
Jewish American classical musicians
Jewish American film score composers
Jewish American songwriters
Jewish American television composers
Living people
Music Academy of the West alumni
Musicians from Los Angeles
People from Ventura County, California
Private Music artists
Songwriters from California
The Thacher School alumni
USC Thornton School of Music alumni
Varèse Sarabande Records artists
Walt Disney Animation Studios people